Institut auf dem Rosenberg, often referred to as Rosenberg, is a private, family-run, international boarding school located in St. Gallen, Switzerland. Established in 1889 by Elrich Schmidt, Rosenberg was originally known as Institut Dr Schmidt and gained its current name in the 1930s after the death of its founder.

Owned and managed by the Gademann family, Rosenberg is among the most expensive schools in the world, maintains a strict policy of secrecy regarding the names of its alumni, and unlike most other private institutions, does not accept donations of any kind. As of 2019, it had a student body of around 300 students drawn from 48 nationalities.

The Swiss educational reformer Johann Heinrich Pestalozzi inspired the philosophy of the school and one of his quotes, "to learn to live is the goal of all education", is reflected in the motto.

History 
The Institut auf dem Rosenberg was founded in 1889 by Ulrich Schmidt and originally carried the name of the founder, Institut Dr. Schmidt. With the death of the school's founder in 1924, the school was renamed and acquired by the Gademann family in the 1930s.

The school developed multiple sections due to its international character, each of which prepared students to sit different qualifications; these were Swiss, German, Italian, and Anglo-American. By the 1960's the Anglo-American section of the school typically had around 60 pupils aged between eleven and eighteen. Irrespective of country of origin, the bulk of the international students would also sit for the American SAT. During this period the staff turnover was apparently high. Milton Toubkin, an educationist who founded Southbank International School, argued the school at this time was more concerned with money than academic standards.

Bernhard Gademann, who was a pupil in the 1980's, is the fourth generation of his family to head the school, and took over after a prior career in finance and technology.

Admissions
Rosenberg has a limited student body and has been described as among the more exclusive Swiss boarding schools. Families are encouraged to apply early as spaces are allocated on a first-come basis and judged on merit; although, in theory, it is possible for a new student to join after the academic year begins. Successful entry depends on passing a personal interview and an admissions exam.

Various figures have been suggested for the total enrollment. A 2019 article in the magazine Air Mail claimed 300 students from 48 different nationalities, while the South China Morning Post reported in the same year that "no more than 260" are enrolled. Other sources have repeated a lower figure of 230.

Fees
As of 2019, Rosenberg is the most expensive school in the world when both tuition and boarding costs are taken into account.

The base fee covering academic tuition, school meals and similar is CHF. Additional fees for housing, extracurriculars and personal expenses amount to CHF on average. This makes for a combined cost in dollars of around $150,000 per year.

Academic curriculum

Rosenberg prepares its students for a broad range of external exams including the IGCEs, A-Levels, Advanced Placement (AP’s), the International Baccalaureate (IB) as well as the GIB DP Programme (German International Baccalaureate). Additionally, Rosenberg is an official testing centre for CEFR A1-C2 (including Cambridge, Goethe, DELF), SAT and the IELTS.

An important element of the school is the Rosenberg International Curriculum (RIC), which enables students to supplement core classes with a variety of co-curricular courses. More than 60 such courses are available, examples being 'Wealth Creation & Investment', 'The Art of Strategy & Game Theory', 'Biotechnology', and 'Applied Robotics'. In a 2019 interview, Headmaster Gademann boasted that "we teach pretty much anything from international law to product design and entrepreneurship".

There is a strong focus on creativity and interpersonal skills alongside academic elements in general. Individual Development Plan (IDP) specialists design plans for each student. Such plans are described by the school itself as a way of ensuring student interests and ambitions are matched to their aspirations for university and beyond. It is claimed this "artisanal guidance" means students receive an education most appropriate to them and encourage them to take more ownership over their learning.

For 2021, Rosenberg students scored an average of 38 on the IB, compared to a worldwide average of 33. It is not uncommon for students to take qualifications and courses ahead of their age group.

Institut auf dem Rosenberg offers a range of summer camps and winter courses that provide language lessons with skills development.

Accreditation
The school is a member of the Swiss Federation of Private Schools (SFPS) as well as the Swiss Group of International Schools (SGIS).

By Swiss Authorities
Rosenberg's Kindergarten, primary education programs (Pre-School and Primary School, grades 1–5) and lower secondary education program (Middle School, grades 6–8) are accredited by the bureau for elementary school (Amt für Volksschule), department for education (Bildungsdepartement), canton of St. Gallen.

Rosenberg's upper secondary education programs (High School, grades 9–12) is not accredited by the department of education (Bildungsdepartement), canton of St. Gallen, nor by the Swiss Federal State Secretariat for Education, Research and Innovation (SERI).

By International Authorities 
Institut auf dem Rosenberg is internationally accredited by Cognia (formerly AdvancED). The school is a member of the European Council of International Schools and accredited for the International Baccalaureate (IB) - Diploma Programme.

Campus life

The Rosenberg campus is 100,000m² of private parkland. Students are housed in restored art-nouveau villas according to gender and age. These feature single or double rooms with en-suite bathrooms.

One of the social highlights of the year is the Rosenberg Ball, for which pupils are coached by professionals for two months in preparation.

Sport
Owing to its location between Lake Constance and the Alpstein mountain range, Rosenberg provides the chance to ski in winter and take advantage of other outdoor activities. Ice skating, mountain biking, football, golf, swimming, volleyball and basketball are examples of the numerous sports on offer.

Uniform
There is no official school uniform but a formal dress code comprising suits for boys and skirts for girls. This applies from Monday to Friday during breakfast, lunch, and academic lessons. Smart casual is acceptable at dinner and on the weekend.

Awards and recognition 
The school was recognised as the "Most Prestigious International Boarding School" in 2019 by Corporate Vision Magazine.

Notable alumni

Rosenberg alumni form a close, international network that helps them in their later careers. The school operates a "strict privacy policy" and does not confirm or deny names of current or former students, although  the case of Mario J. Molina, winner of the 1995 Nobel Prize in Chemistry, is a notable exception.

Information on alumni therefore depends on either personal admission or media reports. Those known to have completed at least part of their education at Rosenberg include, in addition to the previously mentioned Molina, businessman and landowner Karl Friedrich, Prince of Hohenzollern, mathematician Walter Rudin, and the playboy photographer Gunter Sachs. The exiled Russian businessman Mikhail Khodorkovsky is said to have educated his children at Rosenberg.

The school's reluctance to discuss the names of famous former students is said to reflect a "quiet confidence" in the quality of its product. Gademann has claimed that both "Silicon Valley figures" and members of "industrial dynasties" have attended Rosenberg.

Notable staff
The German writer W.G. Sebald taught for a year at the school from 1969–1970.

See also
 Institut Le Rosey
 Eton College
 Phillips Exeter Academy

Notes

References

External links
 Official website
 Official website Summer School

Private schools in Switzerland
Boarding schools in Switzerland
Italian international schools in Switzerland
 
Educational institutions established in 1889
1889 establishments in Switzerland